Below is a list of prisons within Shanghai in the People's Republic of China.

References

 
Shanghai
Prisons